Thus Finishes the Night (French: Ainsi finit la nuit) is a 1949 French drama film directed by Emil E. Reinert and starring Anne Vernon, Claude Dauphin and Henri Guisol. It was shot at the Billancourt Studios in Paris. The film's sets were designed by the art director Lucien Aguettand.

Synopsis
A woman begins an affair with a concert pianist.

Cast
 Anne Vernon as Catherine Beryl
 Claude Dauphin as Le pianiste André Fuger
 Henri Guisol as Le procureur Georges Beryl
 Katherine Kath as Une voyageuse
 André Versini as Le commis-voyageur Guy Moret
 Albert Duvaleix as Prunier - le concierge du théâtre
 Gilberte Géniat as Jeannette
 Mona Dol as La mère de Catherine
 Albert Michel as Le contrôleur
 Hennery as Ernest
 Léon Pauléon as Un voyageur

References

Bibliography 
 Rège, Philippe. Encyclopedia of French Film Directors, Volume 1. Scarecrow Press, 2009.

External links 
 

1949 films
1949 drama films
French drama films
1940s French-language films
Films directed by Emil-Edwin Reinert
Films shot at Billancourt Studios
French black-and-white films
1940s French films